In mathematics, there are a few topological spaces named after M. K. Fort, Jr.

Fort space 
Fort space is defined by taking an infinite set X, with a particular point p in X, and declaring open the subsets A of X such that:
 A does not contain p, or
 A contains all but a finite number of points of X.

Note that the subspace  has the discrete topology and is open and dense in X.
X is homeomorphic to the one-point compactification of an infinite discrete space.

Modified Fort space 
Modified Fort space is similar but has two particular points.  So take an infinite set X with two distinct points p and q, and declare open the subsets A of X such that:
 A contains neither p nor q, or
 A contains all but a finite number of points of X.

The space X is compact and T1, but not Hausdorff.

Fortissimo space 
Fortissimo space is defined by taking an uncountable set X, with a particular point p in X, and declaring open the subsets A of X such that:
 A does not contain p, or
 A contains all but a countable number of points of X.

Note that the subspace  has the discrete topology and is open and dense in X.  The space X is not compact, but it is a Lindelöf space.  It is obtained by taking an uncountable discrete space, adding one point and defining a topology such that the resulting space is Lindelöf and contains the original space as a dense subspace.  Similarly to Fort space being the one-point compactification of an infinite discrete space, one can describe Fortissimo space as the one-point Lindelöfication of an uncountable discrete space.

See also

Notes

References
M. K. Fort, Jr. "Nested neighborhoods in Hausdorff spaces." American Mathematical Monthly vol.62 (1955) 372.

Topological spaces